Thomas Walter Alley (July 27, 1942 – February 5, 1993) was an American football player and coach. Alley was an All-Southern Conference tackle and 1964 graduate of The College of William and Mary. He held an M.Ed. from William and Mary, was drafted by the Pittsburgh Steelers and Boston Patriots, and played for two years with the Richmond Rebels of the Atlantic Coast Football League (ACFL) and Continental Football League (COFL) before joining the coaching staff at Princess Anne High School in Virginia Beach, Virginia.

In 1967 Alley became the line coach at Randolph–Macon College in Ashland, Virginia. In his first season, 1967, the Yellow Jackets finished 7–2 and won the Mason–Dixon Conference and Virginia Small College League (VSCL) championships. In his second and final season, 1968, Randolph–Macon achieved the school's only undefeated, untied season, since the football program's inaugural campaign in 1881, and repeated as Mason–Dixon and VSCL champions. 

After serving as an assistant for three seasons, Alley was named as the head coach at the University of Louisville for the 1973 season, succeeding Lee Corso. Alley's 1973 Cardinals team was 5–6 in his first year (3–2 in the Missouri Valley Conference (MVC).

Alley's 1974 Louisville team finished 4–7 (3–2 in the MVC). The team opened the season with three losses, to Memphis State (16–10), Auburn (16–3) and Cincinnati (7–6). After a win against  (20–15), Louisville lost to Vanderbilt (44–0) before closing with a victory against  (10–8). Alley was fired after two seasons and replaced as Louisville's head coach by Vince Gibson.

Alley died of an apparent heart attack, on February 5, 1993, at a hospital in Rock Hill, South Carolina.

Head coaching record

References

1942 births
1993 deaths
American football defensive linemen
American football tackles
Continental Football League players
Louisville Cardinals football coaches
Randolph–Macon Yellow Jackets football coaches
William & Mary Tribe football players
High school football coaches in Virginia
People from Wytheville, Virginia
Coaches of American football from Virginia
Players of American football from Virginia